The , abbreviated as IdcN, is a museum and exhibition hall located in Sakae, Nagoya, central Japan.

History 
The World Design Exhibition 1989 was held in Nagoya. The museum was established in 1992 and opened in 1996 in the Nadya Park skyscraper. Exhibited are leading designers and artists of conceptualisation, form and function. The pieces range from the Art Deco to the present. Works by Isamu Noguchi and Arne Jacobsen are included, as well as product design icons such as the Mini Cooper.

The Loft department store for shoppers interested in design is also located in Nadya Park.

Access by public transport is Yabachō Station on the Meijō Line.

References

External links 
 Homepage of the IdcN

Design museums
Art museums and galleries in Nagoya
Art museums established in 1992
1992 establishments in Japan